Aleksey Kharitonovich (born 30 April 1995) is a Belarusian professional footballer who plays for Belshina Bobruisk].

References

External links 
 
 

1995 births
Living people
Belarusian footballers
Association football goalkeepers
FC Dinamo Minsk players
FC Bereza-2010 players
FC Energetik-BGU Minsk players
FC Belshina Bobruisk players